Arnold Henry Bergier was an artist who created bronze sculptures. He lived in New York. He died 19 January 2007 in New York City at the age of 92.

Sculptures by Arnold Henry Bergier
John Dewey (1940)
John Barbirolli (1941)
Arturo Toscanini (1942)
Chester Nimitz (1945)
George Aarons, portrait of fellow sculptor (1945)
Albert Einstein (1948)
Four Stones (1952)
Richard E. Byrd memorial plaque (1956)
Bust of Moses 1967
Walt Whitman memorial plaque (1968)
Madonna (1968)

American sculptors
2007 deaths
Year of birth missing